The 1993 Motorcraft Quality Parts 500 was the fourth stock car race of the 1993 NASCAR Winston Cup Series season and the 34th iteration of the event. The race was originally scheduled to be held on Sunday, March 14, 1993, but was postponed by nearly a week due to the 1993 Storm of the Century that affected a majority of the American East Coast. The race was ran on Saturday, March 20, in Hampton, Georgia at Atlanta Motor Speedway, a  permanent asphalt quad-oval intermediate speedway. The race took the scheduled 328 laps to complete. Depending on fuel mileage, Wood Brothers Racing driver Morgan Shepherd would manage to conserve enough fuel on the final green flag stint to take his fourth and final career NASCAR Winston Cup Series victory and his only victory of the season. To fill out the top three, Morgan–McClure Motorsports driver Ernie Irvan and Penske Racing South driver Rusty Wallace would finish second and third, respectively.

Background 

Atlanta Motor Speedway (formerly Atlanta International Raceway) is a 1.522-mile race track in Hampton, Georgia, United States, 20 miles (32 km) south of Atlanta. It has annually hosted NASCAR Winston Cup Series stock car races since its inauguration in 1960.

The venue was bought by Speedway Motorsports in 1990. In 1994, 46 condominiums were built over the northeastern side of the track. In 1997, to standardize the track with Speedway Motorsports' other two intermediate ovals, the entire track was almost completely rebuilt. The project made the track one of the fastest on the NASCAR circuit.

Entry list 

 (R) - denotes rookie driver.

*Driver switched to Greg Sacks for the race due to Jones having prior commitments in the IMSA GT Championship.

Qualifying 
Qualifying was originally scheduled to be split into two rounds. The first round was held on Friday, March 12, at 2:30 PM EST. Originally, the first 20 positions were going to be determined by first round qualifying, with positions 21-40 meant to be determined the following day on Saturday, March 13. However, due to a major snowstorm and nor'easter, the second round was cancelled. As a result, qualifying was set using the results from the first round.

Four drivers would fail to qualify.

Full qualifying results

Race results

Standings after the race 

Drivers' Championship standings

Note: Only the first 10 positions are included for the driver standings.

References 

1993 NASCAR Winston Cup Series
NASCAR races at Atlanta Motor Speedway
March 1993 sports events in the United States
1993 in sports in Georgia (U.S. state)